This is an index of education articles.

A 
Abstract management
- Academia
- Academic administration
- Academic Assembly
- Academic conference
- Academic degree
- Academic department
- Academic dishonesty
- Academic elitism
- Academic freedom
- Academic honor code
- Academic mobility
- Academic rank
- Academic Ranking of World Universities
- Academic regalia
- Academic Research Alliance
- Academic seduction
- Academic senate
- Academic term
- Academic writing
- Academician
- Academy
- ACTFL Proficiency Guidelines
- Active learning
- Activity theory
- Actual development level
- Adaptive Design
- ADDIE Model
- Adolescence
- Adult education
- Adult high school
- Adult learner
- Advanced Placement Program
- Affect heuristic
- Affective filter
- Agoge
- Agricultural education
- AICC
- Algorithm of Inventive Problems Solving
- Algorithmic learning theory
- Alma mater
- Alternative assessment
- Alternative education
- Alternative high school
- Alternative school
- ALT-J - Research in Learning Technology
- Alumni association
- Alumnus/a
- Al-Madinah International University
- American Educational Research Association
- Anchoring and adjustment
- Andragogy
- Angelman syndrome
- Animated narrative vignette
- Anti-bias curriculum
- Anti-intellectualism
- Anti-racist mathematics
- Applied Behavior Analysis
- Apprenticeship
- Art education
- Articulation (education)
- Assistive technology
- Asynchronous learning
- Atkinson-Shiffrin theory
- Attention versus memory in prefrontal cortex
- Attention-deficit hyperactivity disorder
- Attribution theory
- Auckland University of Technology Alumni Association
- Audiovisual Education
- Australasian Journal of Educational Technology
- Autism
- Autodidacticism
- Autonomous learning
- Autoshaping
- Availability heuristic

B 
Bachelor of Arts
- Bachelor of Education
- Bachelor of Science
- Baconian method
- Baddeley's model of working memory
- Barron's Educational Series
- Basic education
- Behaviorism
- Bias in education
- Bilingual education
- Biliteracy
- Bionics
- Biscuit Fire publication controversy
- Blended learning
- Blindness and education
- Block scheduling
- Board of education
- Boarding school
- Bobo doll experiment
- Bologna declaration
- Bologna process
- Book flood
- Book-and-Record set
- Borough Road
- Brainstorming
- Brainwashing
- Bridge program
- British degree abbreviations
- Bulletin board
- Bullying
- Business Education Initiative
- C.Phil.

C 
California Virtual Academies
- Cambridge International Examinations
- Campus novel
- Campus university
- Career development
- Career
- Carnegie Classification of Institutions of Higher Education
- Catholic education
- Certificate of Higher Education
- Chaining
- Challenge Index
- Chancellor (education)
- Character education
- Charter schools
- Cheder
- Chemistry education
- Child
- Childhood amnesia
- Chunking (psychology)
- Citizenship education
- Civic, Social and Political Education
- Class ring
- Classical conditioning
- Classical education
- Classroom management
- CliffsNotes
- Co-counselling
- Coeducation
- Cognitive apprenticeship
- Cognitive load
- Cognitive map
- Cognitive tutor
- Collaborative learning
- College and university rankings
- College rivalry
- College
- Commentarii
- Commonwealth Scholarship
- Communicative language teaching
- Community college
- Community High School (Ann Arbor, Michigan)
- Community of practice
- Community Podcast
- Comprehensive school
- Compulsory education
- Computer assisted instruction
- Computer Based Learning
- Computer Supported Cooperative Learning
- Computer-adaptive test
- Computer-based training
- Concept map
- Conceptual blending
- Confabulation
- Congregation (university)
- Connectionism
- Connexions
- Constructive criticism
- Constructivism (learning theory)
- Continuing education
- Coolhunting
- Cooperative education
- Cooperative learning
- Core curriculum
- Corporal punishment
- Council for the Indian School Certificate Examinations
- Course (education)
- course atlas
- Creative Education Foundation
- Creative industries
- Creative problem solving
- Creative services
- Creative Services Firms
- Creativity
- Creativity techniques
- Criterion-referenced test
- Critical pedagogy
- Critical thinking
- Cronbach's alpha
- Cross-registration
- Cue-dependent forgetting
- Culfest
- Cultural learning
- Culturally relevant teaching
- Curriculum
- Curriculum-based measurement

D 
Dalton Plan
- Dead white males
- Dean (education)
- Decay theory
- Declarative learning
- Declarative memory
- Democratic school
- Demyship
- UK Department for Education and Skills
- Deschooling
- Deweyism
- Dilemma
- Diploma of Education
- Diploma of Higher Education
- Diploma
- Direct instruction
- Disability
- Distance education
- DISTAR
- Doctor of Canon Law
- Driving simulator
- Dry campus
- Dsamun
- Dual education system
- Dual-coding theory
- Duck test
- Dumbing down
- Dunce
- Dynamic assessment
- Dyslexia

E 
Early Childhood Education Act
- Early childhood education
- Early college entrance program
- Early literacy
- Edline
- Education International
- Education of girls and women
- Education Policy Analysis Archives
- Education policy
- Education reform
- Education voucher
- Education
- Educational animation
- Educational assessment
- Educational counseling
- Educational evaluation
- Educational existentialism
- Educational leadership
- Educational music
- Educational perennialism
- Educational progressivism
- Educational psychology
- Educational reform in occupied Japan
- Educational research
- Educational Technology & Society
- Educational technology
- Edusat
- Edutainment
- Effect size
- Eidetic memory
- E-learning
- Electronic portfolio
- Elkonin boxes
- E-mentoring
- Emergent algorithm
- Employment counsellor
- Encaenia
- English village
- Environmental education
- Episodic memory
- Erhard Seminars Training
- Eromenos
- Esalen Institute
- Ethics
- Eurisko
- Eurythmy
- Evolutionary educational psychology
- Executive Education
- Exhibitioner
- Exosomatic memory
- Experiential education
- Experimental analysis of behavior
- Expulsion (academia)
- Extinction (psychology)
- Extracurricular Activity

F 
Factor analysis
- Factorial experiment
- Faculty (division)
- Faculty (teaching staff)
- False memory
- Fartlek
- Fast mapping
- Fear conditioning
- Fellow
- Filmstrip
- Finishing school
- Flashbulb memory
- Flashcard
- Flow (psychology)
- Forbidden knowledge
- Force field analysis
- Forensics
- Forgetting
- Forgetting curve
- For-Profit Education
- Four stages of competence
- Framework for Intervention
- Free education
- Free school meals
- French immersion
- Froebel Gifts
- Frosh
- Functional illiteracy
- Further education
- Future Problem Solving Program

G 
Gap Year
- Gateway to Higher Education (program)
- GED
- General education requirements
- General intelligence factor
- General National Vocational Qualification
- Getting Things Done
- G. I. American Universities
- Gifted education
- Gifted
- Globalization
- Goal Theory
- Grade (education)
- Graduate Diploma
- Graduate school
- Graduation
- Graphic organizers
- Grounded theory (Glaser)
- Grounded theory (Strauss)

H 
Habituation
- Halo effect
- Harkness table
- Hawthorne effect
- Head boy
- Head Start Program
- Head teacher
- High school
- High/Scope
- Higher Certificate
- Higher Diploma
- Higher education
- Higher National Certificate
- Higher National Diploma
- Highly sensitive person
- Hipster PDA
- History and philosophy of science
- History of education in Japan
- HM (patient)
- Holland Codes
- Homeschooling
- Honorary title (academic)
- Honors student
- Hooked on Phonics
- Hospitality management
- How to Read a Book
- How to Solve It
- Human memory process
- Human Performance Technology
- Human Potential Movement
- Humanistic education
- Human rights education

I 
Iconic memory
- Imitation
- Imperial examination
- Imprinting (psychology)
- Inclusive classroom
- Incremental reading
- Independent scholar
- Independent school
- Individualized instruction
- Infant Education
- INFOCOMP Journal of Computer Science
- Information design
- Information mapping
- Innate behaviour
- Inquiry education
- Institutional pedagogy
- Instructional capital
- Instructional design
- Instructional scaffolding
- Instructional technology
- Instructional theory
- Integrative learning
- Intellectual
- Intelligence (trait)
- Interdisciplinary teaching
- Interference theory
- International Democratic Education Conference
- International Journal of Educational Technology
- Science Olympiad, International
- Internet tutorial
- Intertwingularity
- Intrinsic motivation
- Ipsative
- Item response theory
- Ivy League

J 
JANET
- Jewish quota
- Jigsaw Classroom
- Joint Association of Classical Teachers
- Joint Committee on Standards for Educational Evaluation
- JUD
- Juku

K 
K-12
- K-5 (education)
- Karzer
- Kentucky Education Reform Act
- Kindergarten
- Kinesthetic learning
- Knowledge building
- Knowledge cafe
- Knowledge is Power
- Knowledge management
- Knowledge transfer
- Knowledge visualization
- Knowledge
- Kohlberg's stages of moral development
- Kurso de Esperanto

L 
Landmark Education
- Language education
- Language policy
- Latchkey child
- Lateral thinking
- Latin honors
- Law of effect
- Laws of Technical Systems Evolution
- League Tables of British Universities
- Learned helplessness
- Learner autonomy
- Learning by teaching
- Learning cycle
- Learning disability
- Learning sciences
- Learning styles
- Learning theory (education)
- Learning theory
- Learning
- Lecture
- Lecturer
- Legal education
- Legality of homeschooling in the United States
- Legitimate peripheral participation
- Lesson plan
- Lesson
- Level of Invention
- Liberal arts
- Lies My Teacher Told Me
- Lie-to-children
- Life coaching
- Life skills
- Lifelong learning
- Lifespring
- Likert scale
- Linkword
- Lisbon recognition convention
- List of academic disciplines
- List of colleges and universities by country
- Colleges and universities by country, list of
- Universities and colleges by country, list of
- List of fields of doctoral studies
- List of Friends Schools
- List of Phonics Programs
- List of publications in psychology
- List of schools by country
- List of Sudbury schools
- List of Upper Canada College alumni
- Literacy
- LogoVisual thinking (LVT)
- Longitudinal data system
- Long-term memory
- Losada Zone
- Lyceum movement

M 
Machine learning
- Maieutics
- Marketing of schools
- Maslow's hierarchy of needs
- Mass education
- Mastery learning
- Math education
- Mathetics
- Matriculation
- Maturationism
- Mature student
- Medical education
- Medieval university (Asia)
- Medieval university
- Medium of instruction
- Memory consolidation
- Memory
- Mental management
- Mentor
- Mentoring
- Meta learning
- Meta-analysis
- Metacognition
- Mickey Mouse degrees
- Microcosmographia Academica
- Microelectronics Education Programme
- Middle School
- Military academy
- Mind map
- M-learning
- Mnemonic
- Molecular mechanisms of memory
- Money illusion
- Monitorial system
- Montessori method
- Moral reasoning
- Morphological analysis
- Motivation
- Moulage
- Mozart effect
- Music education

N 
National Coalition of Alternative Community Schools
- National Diploma
- National Vocational Qualification
- Nature study
- NEPAD e-school programme
- Network of practice
- Networked learning
- New Games Book
- No Child Left Behind Act
- Nobel Conference
- Non-traditional students
- Normal school
- Norm-referenced test
- Northfield School of Arts and Technology
- Notetaking
- Numeracy
- Numerus clausus
- Nurse education
- Nursing school
- Nurture

O 
Obscurantism
- Observational learning
- Occam's Razor
- Of Education
- One-room school
- Online education
- Online learning
- Online training
- Open classroom
- Open educational resources
- Open Peer Commentary
- Operant conditioning
- Optics
- Optout
- Ordinary National Certificate
- Organizational learning
- Outcome-based education
- Outdoor education
- Out of school learning
- Overjustification effect
- Overlearning

P 
Pair by association
- Parallel education
- Parallel tempering
- Parents' Rights Coalition
- Parent-Teacher Association
- Parsimony
- Passive review
- Pastoral care
- Peabody Education Fund
- Peace education
- Peak–end rule
- Pedagogical patterns
- Pedagogy
- Pedology (children study)
- Peer pressure
- Peer support
- Perpetual Education Fund
- Personal and social education
- Personal budget
- Personal development
- Philosophy of education
- Phonics
- Phonological awareness
- Photovoice
- Phrase completions
- Physical education
- Picture superiority effect
- Picture thinking
- Piled Higher and Deeper
- PISA (student assessment)
- Pit school
- Popular education
- Postdoctoral researcher
- Postgraduate Diploma
- Postgraduate education
- Post-secondary education
- Praxis test
- Predictive validity
- Premack principle
- Preparatory school
- Preschool education
- Primary education
- Principal (university)
- Principle of least astonishment
- Prison education
- Privatdozent
- Private school
- Proactive interference
- Problem finding
- Problem shaping
- Problem solving
- Problem-based learning
- Problem-based learning
- Procedural memory
- Professional degree
- Professionalism
- Professor
- Program evaluation
- Programmed instruction
- Project-based learning
- Propositional knowledge
- Prospective memory
- Pro-Vice-Chancellor
- Provost (education)
- Psychology of learning
- Psychometrics
- Public education
- Public lecture
- Public school (UK)
- Public school (government funded)
- Punishment
- Pushout
- Pygmalion effect

Q 
Quadrivium
- Qualitative psychological research
- Quantitative psychological research
- Quaternary education

R 
Radical Teacher
- Rasch model
- Reactive search
- Reader (academic rank)
- Reading (activity)
- Reading Comprehension
- Reading disability
- Reading education
- Reading Recovery
- Reasoner
- Reasoning
- Recitation
- Recognition heuristic
- Recollection
- Recreational reading
- Reggio Emilia approach
- Reinforcement hierarchy
- Reinforcement
- Reliability (statistics)
- Religious education
- Representative heuristic
- Repressed memory
- Rescorla-Wagner model
- Research assistant
- Research Associate
- Research I university
- Resident Honors Program
- Response to intervention
- Retroactive interference
- Roof and tunnel hacking
- Ropes course
- Rote learning
- Rubric (academic)
- Rubrics (education)
- Running record

S 
- Sail training
- Salutatorian
- Satisficing
- Scholar
- Scholarly method
- Scholarship
- School accreditation
- School and university in literature
- School choice
- School discipline
- School holiday
- School principal
- School psychologist
- School refusal
- School uniform
- School
- Science education
- Scientific classification
- Scientific consensus
- Scientific enterprise
- SCORM
- Scottish Vocational Qualification
- Second language acquisition
- Secondary education
- Second-order conditioning
- Self-concept
- Self-criticism
- Self-Determination Theory
- Self-efficacy
- Self-help
- Self-regulated learning
- Semantic memory
- Seminar
- Senior project
- Sensory memory
- Service learning
- Sex education
- Shaping (psychology)
- Sheffield Scientific School
- Short-term memory
- Similarity heuristic
- Simulated annealing
- Simulation heuristic
- Single-sex education
- Situated cognition
- Situated learning
- Slater Fund
- Sleep-learning
- Slöjd
- Social cognitive theory of morality
- Social cognitive theory
- Social promotion
- Social studies
- Socialization
- Socratic method
- Spaced repetition
- Spatial memory
- Special education
- Specialist degree
- Testing, standardised; public policy
- Standardized testing
- STEM fields
- Stipend
- Student activism
- Student engagement
- Student loan
- Student voice
- Student
- Student-centred learning
- Studium Generale
- Subvocalization
- Sudbury school
- Sudbury Valley School
- Summer Learning Loss
- Summerbridge
- Summerhill School
- Sustained silent reading
- Suzuki method
- SWCHA
- Syllabus
- Symposium

T 
Take-the-best heuristic
- Taking Children Seriously
- Tamariki
- Taxonomy of Educational Objectives
- Teacher in role
- Teachers College
- Teaching credential
- Teaching in-Role
- Teaching method
- Teaching
- Teach First
- Teaching philosophy
- Technology education
- Technology Integration
- Telesecundaria
- Tele-TASK
- Teletraining
- Tens System
- Tenure
- Tertiary education
- TET
- Textbook
- The 2005 Global Intellectuals Poll
- The Circle School
- The Cruelty of Really Teaching Computer Science
- The Dalton School
- The Evolution of Education Museum
- The Hershey Montessori Farm School
- The Hidden Curriculum
- The Magical Number Seven, Plus or Minus Two
- The Princeton Review
- The Seven Habits of Highly Effective People
- The Teaching Company
- Theory of cognitive development
- Theory of multiple intelligences
- Thesis
- Time management
- Town and gown
- Training manual
- Training
- Transfer of learning
- Transformational learning
- Transformative learning
- Très honorable avec félicitations
- Trial and error
- Trial-and-error method
- Triangle Program
- Triarchic theory of intelligence
- Trivium
- TRIZ
- Truancy
- Tuition

U 
Umbrella school
- Undergraduate
- Understanding
- Underwater basket weaving
- United States Academic Decathlon
- United States Department of Education
- Universal Design for Learning
- Universal preschool
- University constituency
- University Interscholastic League
- University of Auckland Society
- University President
- University
- Unschooling
- Upward Bound High School
- Usability testing

V 
Valedictorian
- Validity (statistics)
- Vertical thinking
- Vice-Chancellor
- Videobook
- Virtual learning environment
- Vision Forum
- Vision span
- Visual learning
- Visual memory
- Visual short term memory
- Vocational education
- Vocational school
- Volksschule

W 
- Waldorf education
- Washington Homeschool Organization
- Web literacy
- Web-based training
- Webinar
- WebQuest
- Whole language
- Winnetka Plan
- Wisdom
- Woodcraft
- Working backward from the goal
- Working memory
- World Innovation Summit for Education
- Writing Associate
- Writing Center
- Writing process

X 
XF (grade)

Y 
- Year 1
- Year-round school
- YGLP
- Youth development
- Youth empowerment
- Youth mentoring
- Youth voice

Z 
Zeigarnik effect

See also

Glossary of education-related terms
List of academic disciplines
List of education articles by country

 
Education topics